Pink shrimp may refer to any of the following species:

Pandalus borealis
Pandalus montagui
Pandalus jordani, a shrimp in the genus Pandalus
Farfantepenaeus brevirostris, a shrimp in the genus Farfantepenaeus
Metapenaeus monoceros

See also
Southern pink shrimp, Farfantepenaeus notialis
Northern pink shrimp, Farfantepenaeus duorarum

Animal common name disambiguation pages